Donna M. Di Grazia is an American musicologist and choral conductor. She is the David J. Baldwin Professor of Music and Choral Conductor at Pomona College in Claremont, California, and the chair of the college's music department.

References

External links
Faculty page at Pomona College

Year of birth missing (living people)
Living people
Pomona College faculty
American musicologists
American choral conductors